Benjamin Edward "Jamie" Muhoberac is an American session keyboardist with numerous credits. He is best known for his work with Seal and Was (Not Was).

Biography
Muhoberac has worked with acts including The All-American Rejects, Fleetwood Mac, Bob Dylan, The Rolling Stones, Backstreet Boys, Chris Cornell, Paradise Lost, Bowling For Soup, Eric Prydz, Genesis, Ofra Haza and Pet Shop Boys. He has often worked with producer Trevor Horn including for Seal and Rod Stewart. In recent years, he has worked with Jane's Addiction, Avenged Sevenfold, Sum 41, Joe Cocker, Phil Collins, John Mayer, Front Line Assembly, My Chemical Romance, Jon Hassell, Lasso and John Sykes. Kid Harpoon said of him, "I know Jamie Muhoberac, he's one of the best keyboard players in the world and has played with everyone."

His first tour was with Was (Not Was). He was Seal's musical director in the 1990s.

He has had a writing partnership with Carmen Rizzo. They co-wrote Paul Oakenfold's 2002 single "Southern Sun", which reached #16 in the UK singles chart. They also co-wrote multiple songs on Delerium's 2003 album Chimera, including the single "Truly", which reached #54 in the UK.

He played live with John Doe in 2002. In 2019, he became the touring keyboardist for My Chemical Romance. In 2022, he also toured with John Mayer.

Personal life
He lives in Los Angeles.

His father was pianist, producer, and arranger Larry Muhoberac, who worked with Barbra Streisand, Neil Diamond, Dean Martin, Elvis Presley, Silverchair, Sir John Rowles and numerous others. His brother is Parrish Muhoberac, a multi-instrumentalist musician, producer and performer.

Discography

 Bob Dylan, Under the Red Sky, 1990 (certified Silver in the UK)
 Iggy Pop, Brick by Brick, 1990 (#50 in the UK, #34 in Germany, #13 in Switzerland)
 Paula Abdul, Spellbound, 1991 (#1 in the US, #4 in the UK)
 Seal, Seal, 1991 (#1 in the UK, #27 in the US)
 Mike Oldfield, Tubular Bells II, 1992 (#1 in the UK, #7 in Germany)
 Ringo Starr, Time Takes Time, 1992
 The B-52's, Good Stuff, 1992 (#8 in the UK, #16 in the US)
 Billy Idol, Cyberpunk, 1993 (#20 in the UK, #48 in the US)
 Seal, Seal, 1994 (#1 in the UK, #15 in the US)
 Tina Turner, Wildest Dreams, 1996 (#4 in the UK, #1 in New Zealand)
 The Rolling Stones, Bridges to Babylon, 1997 (#6 in the UK, #3 in the US, #1 in Germany)
 Seal, Human Being, 1998
 Chocolate Genius, Black Music, 1998
 Jon Hassell, Fascinoma, 1999
 various artists, The Million Dollar Hotel: Music from the Motion Picture, 2000
 Paul Oakenfold, Bunkka, 2002
 Alanis Morissette, Under Rug Swept, 2002 (#1 in the US and Italy, #2 in the UK)
 Faith Hill, Cry, 2002 (#1 in the US, #2 in Australia)
 Seal, Seal IV, 2003 (#4 in the UK, #3 in the US, #1 in Switzerland)
 Melissa Etheridge, Lucky, 2004 (#15 in the US)
 Alanis Morissette, So-Called Chaos, 2004 (#5 in the US, #8 in the UK, #1 in Germany)
 Pet Shop Boys, Fundamental, 2006 (#5 in the UK, #4 in Germany)
 Gavin Rossdale, Wanderlust, 2008 (#40 in Austria)
 Escala, Escala, 2009 (#2 in the UK)
 John Legend, Evolver, 2009 (#4 in the US)
 Jon Hassell, Last Night the Moon Came Dropping Its Clothes in the Street, 2009
 Meat Loaf, Hang Cool Teddy Bear, 2010, co-wrote "Song of Madness" (#4 in the UK, #27 in the US)
 Taylor Swift, Red, 2012 (#1 in the US, UK, Canada, Australia, New Zealand)
 Florence K, I'm Leaving You, 2013
 Seal, 7, 2015 (#13 in the UK)
 Josh Groban, All That Echoes, 2016
 Beth Hart, A Tribute to Led Zeppelin, 2022 (#17 in the UK)
 My Chemical Romance, The Foundations of Decay, 2022

Filmography

 Fetishes, 1996: music composer"Fetishes", Variety, July 1–14, 1996, p. 36, by David Stratton
 The Million Dollar Hotel, 2000
 Brother Bear, 2003: performer
 Rent, 2005: keys
 Sarah Palin: You Betcha!'', 2011: music composer

References

External links

 

Year of birth missing (living people)
Living people
American session musicians
21st-century American keyboardists